Bete Mendes (born Elizabeth Mendes de Oliveira; 11 May 1949) is a Brazilian actress and politician.

Biography

Early life

Bete Mendes was born Elizabeth Mendes de Oliveira in Santos, São Paulo. She is the daughter of Osmar Pires de Oliveira, a Sub-Lieutenant of the Brazilian Air Force, and Maria Mendes de Oliveira. She acted in school plays since she was 5.

However, her artistic career really began at age 15, in her hometown of Santos, in the role of bunny Naná in the play A Árvore que Andava, by Oscar Von Phull.

Mendes has a degree in performing arts by the University of São Paulo (USP), and was pursuing a degree in Sociology when she was arrested by the political police of the military dictatorship.

She performed by the first time in theatre with the play A Cozinha (The kitchen) on 1968. At that same year, she had a prominent role in the popular TV Tupi soap opera Beto Rockfeller.

Arrest

On 1970, Mendes was arrested by the DOI-CODI, being held as prisoner for four years. Between September and October 1974, she was once again detained, this time being tortured. She was acquitted by the Superior Tribunal Militar (Superior Military Court), being released after spending 30 days in prison. Upon her release, she decided to quit the Sociology School.

Political career

Mendes actively participated in several social movements, such as for the professional regulation of artists (achieved in 1978) and the movement for the amnesty. She supported the strikes of metalworkers in the ABC Region, where she became familiar with Luiz Inácio Lula da Silva, then a growing figure in the Brazilian political scene. Along with Lula, Mendes was one of the founding members of the Workers' Party, by which she was elected Congresswoman for the 1983-87 term.

On 15 January 1985, Mendes was expelled from the Workers' Party for having voted, in the Electoral college (indirect election system), for Tancredo Neves as President. She was re-elected for the Congress by the Brazilian Democratic Movement Party, but this time she was a member of the National Constituent Assembly. Mendes was also Secretary of Culture in the state of São Paulo between 15 March 1987 and 21 December 1988, and president of the Fundação de Artes do Estado do Rio de Janeiro (Arts Foundation of the State of Rio de Janeiro) in 1999.

Brilhante Ustra case
When exercising her second term as congresswoman, Mendes joined the entourage of President José Sarney on an official visit to Uruguay. On 17 August 1985, she discovered that among the officers of the Brazilian Embassy in Uruguay were Carlos Alberto Brilhante Ustra, the man who tortured her in prison.

Filmography

Film
 2006 - Brasília 18%
 2004 - Vestido de Noiva
 1981 - Eles Não Usam Black-tie
 1980 - Insônia
 1980 - J.S. Brown, o último herói
 1979 - Os Amantes da Chuva
 1974 - As Delícias da Vida
 1968 - Sandra Sandra

Television
 2017 - Tempo de Amar as Irmã Imaculada
 2013 - Flor do Caribe as Olívia Soares
 2012 - Gabriela as Florzinha Reis
 2011 - Insensato Coração as Zuleica Alencar
 2009 - Caras e Bocas as Piedade Batista
 2008 - Faça Sua História as Iracema
 2008 - Casos e Acasos as Hilda
 2007 - Sítio do Picapau Amarelo as Dona Benta
 2006 - Páginas da Vida as Sister Natércia
 2005 - América as Fátima
 2004 - Seus Olhos sa Edite
 2003 - A Casa das Sete Mulheres as Dona Ana Joaquina
 2000 - Aquarela do Brasil as Olga
 1999 - Terra Nostra as Ana Esplendore
 1998 - Brida as Diva
 1996 - O Rei do Gado as Donana
 1994 - Pátria Minha as Zuleica
 1994 - Memorial de Maria Moura as Maria Moura's mother
 1994 - Quatro por Quatro as Fatima
 1993 - O Mapa da Mina as Carmem Rocha
 1992 - Anos Rebeldes as Carmem Damaceno
 1990 - Lua Cheia de Amor as Emília
 1989 - Tieta as Aída
 1985 - O Tempo e o Vento as Maria Valéria Terra
 1985 - De Quina pra Lua as Patrícia
 1981 - Floradas na Serra as Elza
 1980 - Dulcinéa Vai à Guerra as Jerusa
 1980 - Pé de Vento as Terezinha
 1978 - Sinal de Alerta as Vera
 1977 - Sinhazinha Flô as Flor
 1976 - O Casarão as Vânia
 1975 - Bravo! as Lia di Lorenzo
 1974 - O Rebu as Sílvia
 1973 - Divinas & Maravilhosas as Carolina
 1973 - A Volta de Beto Rockfeller as Renata
 1972 - A Revolta dos Anjos as Stela
 1972 - Na Idade do Lobo as Carina
 1971 - Nossa Filha Gabriela as Catarina
 1970 - O Meu Pé de Laranja Lima as Godóia
 1970 - Simplesmente Maria as Angélica
 1969 - Super Plá as Titina
 1968 - Beto Rockfeller as Renata
 1966 - Águias de Fogo

References

External links
 

1949 births
Living people
People from Santos, São Paulo
Brazilian film actresses
Brazilian television actresses
Brazilian torture victims
Brazilian Democratic Movement politicians
Workers' Party (Brazil) politicians
Members of the Chamber of Deputies (Brazil) from São Paulo